In mathematics, Solèr's theorem is a result concerning certain infinite-dimensional vector spaces. It states that any orthomodular form that has an infinite orthonormal sequence is a Hilbert space over the real numbers, complex numbers or quaternions. Originally proved by Maria Pia Solèr, the result is significant for quantum logic and the foundations of quantum mechanics. In particular, Solèr's theorem helps to fill a gap in the effort to use Gleason's theorem to rederive quantum mechanics from information-theoretic postulates. It is also an important step in the Heunen-Kornell axiomatisation of the category of Hilbert spaces.

Physicist John C. Baez notes,Nothing in the assumptions mentions the continuum: the hypotheses are purely algebraic. It therefore seems quite magical that [the division ring over which the Hilbert space is defined] is forced to be the real numbers, complex numbers or quaternions.Writing a decade after Solèr's original publication, Pitowsky calls her theorem "celebrated".

Statement 

Let  be a division ring. That means it is a ring in which one can add, subtract, multiply, and divide but in which the multiplication need not be commutative. Suppose this ring has a conjugation, i.e. an operation  for which

 

 

which is   -linear  in left (or in the right) entry, satisfying the identity

 

This is called a Hermitian form. Suppose this form is non-degenerate in the sense that

 

For any subspace S let  be the orthogonal complement of S. Call the subspace "closed" if 

Call this whole vector space, and the Hermitian form, "orthomodular" if for every closed subspace S we have that  is the entire space. (The term "orthomodular" derives from the study of quantum logic. In quantum logic, the distributive law is taken to fail due to the uncertainty principle, and it is replaced with the "modular law," or in the case of infinite-dimensional Hilbert spaces, the "orthomodular law.")

A set of vectors  is called "orthonormal" if The result is this:

 If this space has an infinite orthonormal set, then the division ring of scalars is either the field of real numbers, the field of complex numbers, or the ring of quaternions.

References

Hilbert space
Mathematical logic
Theorems in quantum mechanics